The Charles Ford House is a historic house located at Orleans in Jefferson County, New York.

Description and history 
It is a -story, three-by-two-bay structure built in about 1900 in a vernacular Queen Anne style. It is a side-gabled, clapboard-sided building with a rear -story ell and a full width front porch. The rear kitchen ell dates to about 1820. Also on the property is a one-story horse and carriage barn.

It was listed on the National Register of Historic Places on December 20, 1996.

References

Houses on the National Register of Historic Places in New York (state)
Queen Anne architecture in New York (state)
Houses completed in 1900
Houses in Jefferson County, New York
National Register of Historic Places in Jefferson County, New York